Lotte Cohn (1893-1983) was a German Israeli architect and pioneer in the development of Israeli architecture.

Personal life
Recha Charlotte Cohn was born on August 20, 1893, in Charlottenburg, Berlin to Bernhard Cohn, a Jewish medical doctor, and Cäcilie Cohn. She was the youngest of seven children. Her brother, Emil Cohn, was a well-known writer and playwright, who published under the pseudonym, Emil Bernhard. Her eldest sister, Helene Cohn, founded the League of Jewish Women for Gymnastics and Sport in 1910, and performed gymnastics at the Eleventh Zionist Congress in Vienna, Austria, in 1913.

In 1912 Cohn matriculated at the Technical University of Berlin; she graduated from the university's faculty of architecture in 1916, as one of the first women to do so. Between March 1917 and April 1919, Lotte worked in the reconstruction offices of Pillkallen, Tilsit and Gumbinnen in East Prussia. After returning to Berlin, she was employed as an assistant in the office of Zionist architect, Richard Michel.

After accepting the job of first assistant to the architect and city planner, Richard Kauffmann in 1921, Cohn moved to Jerusalem, Mandatory Palestine, with her sisters, Helene and Rose. Her brother, Max, followed two years later with his family, and her mother emigrated to Mandatory Palestine in 1932.

Lotte Cohn died in Tel Aviv on April 7, 1983.

Career
After graduating in 1916, Cohn worked in the reconstruction offices of Pillkallen, Tilsit and Gumbinnen in East Prussia from March 1917 until April 1919. After returning to Berlin, she was employed as an assistant in the office of Zionist architect, Richard Michel.

In Jerusalem, she worked in the office of architect Richard Kauffmann. Much of Cohn's work during this period focused on the development of a distinct Israeli architectural style. During her time in Kaufmann's office, she collaborated with him on the development plan for Jerusalem's garden suburbs as well as the development of several kibbutzim and moshavim on Mt Carmel in Haifa and the proposal for an industrial garden city close to Afula. Her individual projects include the design of the Jewish doctor, Theodor Zlocisti's, house and private clinic in Tel Aviv, the agricultural girl's school in Moshav Nahalal and the first children's house in Israel at Kibbutz Heftziba.

In 1923, Cohn was one of the founding members of the Association of Architects in Palestine, which would later become the Association of Engineers and Architects in Israel. In 1934, she was one of the founding members of the Architect's circle, which was meant to continue the work of the Berlin-based Architect's circle that had been dissolved in 1933 and had counted Walter Gropius, the Taut Brothers, Erich Mendelsohn and Mies van der Rohe as members.

In 1927, due to the worsening economic situation in Mandatory Palestine, the city's urban development office was closed and Cohn found a position with the Chief Architect of the Public Works Department of Mandatory Palestine, Austen St. Barbe Harrison.

From 1929-1930, she returned to Germany and worked for the well-known Berlin architect, Arthur Korn, who was active in the modernist architectural movement in Berlin and associated with Bauhaus architects, such as Walter Gropius and Ernst May.

After her return to Palestine at the end of 1930, Cohn opened her own architect's office in Tel Aviv. Her first project was for her friend, Käte Dan, designing a hotel at 97 HaYarkon Street, which would become an institution for German-speaking emigrants to Palestine and gave her friend the reputation as the founder of the hotel sector in Israel. Afterwards, she constructed a house for Gershom Scholem and Hugo Bergmann at 51 Ramban Street, and a house at 28 Abarbanel Street, where Scholem and his wife, Fania, lived until his death.

In 1929, Cohn left Kauffmann's office, founding her own firm, where she remained until her retirement in 1968.

Accomplishments and works

References 

Israeli women architects
People from Charlottenburg
1898 births
German women architects
1983 deaths
Technical University of Berlin alumni